Sarah Greenwood is a British production designer. She has been nominated six times for an Academy Award – in 2006 for Pride & Prejudice, in 2008 for Atonement, in 2010 for Sherlock Holmes, in 2013 for Anna Karenina and in 2018 for both Beauty and the Beast, and Darkest Hour. In 2013, she was elected best production designer for Anna Karenina at the 66th British Academy Film Awards, the 26th European Film Awards, and won the Art Directors Guild Award for Excellence in Period Film for the same film.

She studied at the Wimbledon College of Art and was production designer in theater for more than three years. However she was not entirely satisfied with the work, so she got a job at the BBC in the early 90s and stayed there for a while. It didn't only get her a better job, but helped in her transformation from theater to TV. She worked on designing sets for television talk show Later... with Jools Holland. Then, in the late 90s, the BBC disappeared the charge of production design, and she had to work in independent cinema.

In an interview column for the Golden Globe Awards, Greenwood stated that green arsenic was used in the corridors for the film Atonement, but the director, Joe Wright, wanted Irish green for the dress that Keira Knightley was going to use in the movie. Sarah decided to give priority to dress and change the colour she had planned for the corridors, because the dress had a risk of losing visual emphasis. She said, "Sometimes you have to be strong to win battles, and sometimes you have to know when to let go." She was not entirely convinced with the color that the director wanted, but there are decisions that an art director must make to get the message to the viewer.

Another story that she tells, is that when she went to get a production art job on a film to be made, someone said, "This project is very large. Sure you can handle it?" She had worked on huge sets, so she said "if you have the tools and enough supplies to meet the needs with a good production team, anything is possible." When she met the director, he said he was asked the same question, this made clear it was not a gender thing. "They just wanted to make sure that we all can do this," she said.

In 2017, Greenwood worked on Disney's live action version of Beauty and the Beast, directed by Bill Condon and released in March, and the biopic Darkest Hour, directed by Joe Wright; receiving Oscar nominations for both.

References

External links

Living people
British production designers
Alumni of Wimbledon College of Arts
Best Production Design BAFTA Award winners
European Film Awards winners (people)
Year of birth missing (living people)
Women production designers